The Wilderness Foundation UK is a British charity which "harnesses the power of wilderness to change lives, and the positive power of humanity to save wilderness". The charity works with vulnerable young people and adults, bringing thousands of people into contact with nature each year.

It was one of the seven charities nominated by Prince Harry and Meghan Markle to receive donations in lieu of wedding presents when the couple married on 19 May 2018. Prince Harry had visited the charity's headquarters at Chatham Green, near Chelmsford, Essex, in 2017, when he met students on a survival course.

References

External links

Youth charities based in the United Kingdom
Social welfare charities based in the United Kingdom
Nature conservation organisations based in the United Kingdom